Vimal Chandran is an Indian visual artist who works with illustration, photography and films.

Early life and career 
Vimal grew up in the town called Palakkad in Kerala. He started painting at the age of four.  Vimal completed his B. Tech from Kerala and is a self taught artist. Vimal came to Bangalore to work as a software engineer and eventually quit his corporate job to do art full time.

Exhibitions and works 

 I have seen the labyrinth and it looks like a straight line, solo exhibition at Thalam, Domlur.
 Escape Velocity, solo exhibition at Durbar Hall, Kochi.
To Italy for Italy, an art and photography project with Lamborghini India
Unposted Letters , a digital illustration series'

His other works include Monsoon Records, a Photography, art and film project based on the monsoon life of Kerala in collaboration with Avial Band and his work for Port Muziris, Marriott

References 

21st-century Indian male artists
Date of birth missing (living people)
Place of birth missing (living people)
Living people
Year of birth missing (living people)
People from Palakkad